Jewel Fatima Avejade Mische-Kurzer (born 29 June 1990) is a Filipino former model and actress.

Biography
Although born in Manila, Mische grew up in Bocaue, Bulacan. Her father is of German-Spanish-American descent while her mother is Filipina. She studied at the University of the Philippines, Yokota Aviation (Flight School), and Cathedral of Praise Music and Bible College.

Career

Starstruck
Mische won and was named as the Ultimate Sweetheart on GMA Network's talent reality search, StarStruck. She gathered hundreds of thousands of votes. Received Millions both in cash and exclusive management contract with GMA Network, Belgian waffle franchises, Calayan endorsement, and scholarships to Informatics.  She also received a modeling contract with the Dutch Mill Yogurt Drink, followed by other major contracts.

After StarStruck
After winning StarStruck, she started in various television guesting and shows. Named as one of the most beautiful stars in the Philippines (YES magazine, Showbiz Central, and Starmometer (3rd most beautiful Filipina in 2008)), she has been featured in different magazines and modeled for several companies including the clothing line Hip Culture. She became part of the noontime variety show, SOP.

In 2007, she got her first acting job and lead role as Luming/Mina in an episode of the Sunday afternoon series Magic Kamison. She was then nominated at the 21st Star Awards for Television for Best New Female Personality for that series. After the said series, she got to play as Madel in Mga Mata ni Angelita, which was her first primetime series. Then she became a part of the cast in Mark Herras' Fantastic Man as Agent Vicky where she replaced the character of Valerie Concepcion which is Agent Belle, due to her transfer to another network.

She landed her first major role in a primetime series called Kamandag, where she played as Jenny, which also starred Richard Gutierrez and Maxene Magalona. She is one of the celebrity endorsers of Brit London.

Jewel became a Regal Films contract star.

Mother Lily of Regal  signed her up to an eight-picture contract that started her being cast to an episode of the horror trilogy Shake, Rattle & Roll 9, which entitled, Engkanto where she got to work, for the first time, with the artists of the rival network. She had a special participation in LaLola and as a host for TV series like the Filipino adaptation of America's Funniest Home Videos, Bitoy's Funniest Videos, among other programs.

Move to ABS-CBN
At the end of 2010, Mische moved to ABS-CBN after she ended her contract under GMA-7 and signed a two-year contract under ABS-CBN and manage by Star Magic. She is one of the Starstruck winners to move to the Kapamilya network, together with Starstruck Avengers Cristine Reyes, Tyron Perez and Nadine Samonte (season 1), Megan Young (season 2), (became Ms. World 2013), Johan Santos and Arci Muñoz (season 3), Paulo Avelino and Prince Stefan (season 4), and Piero Vergara (season 5).

Her first project as a Kapamilya was to be part of Maalaala Mo Kaya, entitled "Ice Cream". She landed her first primetime series in 100 Days to Heaven as Jessica Cruz. And she was chosen to be part of the Filipino adaptation of Mexican telenovela, Maria la del Barrio as Sabrina. Her most recent role was as a lead in Precious Hearts Romances Presents: Paraiso.

Filmography

Television

Film

External links

Jewel Mische profile at iGMA.tv

References

1990 births
Filipino child actresses
Filipino film actresses
Filipino television actresses
Filipino evangelicals
Filipino Pentecostals
Living people
People from Bulacan
People from Manila
Participants in Philippine reality television series
StarStruck (Philippine TV series) participants
StarStruck (Philippine TV series) winners
GMA Network personalities
ABS-CBN personalities
Star Magic